The LAK-15, sometimes known as the LAK-15 Lietuve, was a high performance sailplane designed to set records. A one-off, it was built in the late 1980s in Lithuania, then a member of the USSR.

Design and development

The LAK-15 was designed as a record breaking sailplane and so had a very large span wing with an aspect ratio of 38.4. This was trapezoidal in plan, with 3° of dihedral. It was set at mid-fuselage, built around a single, carbon fibre spar and skinned with three-ply glass fibre/carbon fibre. There were high aspect ratio ailerons over at least half the span, with two flaps inboard.

The oval section fuselage, built of composites, was deepest ahead of the wing with the pilot in semi-reclining position under a long single-piece canopy. Behind the wing the fuselage was very slender and ended with an integral, trapezoidal profile fin. The LAK-15 had a T-tail, with a trapezoidal-plan tailplane carrying rectangular elevators. The fin also carried a broad, rectangular profile rudder.

The LAK-15 landed on a retractable monowheel, equipped with a shock absorber and brake, and a fixed tailwheel.

Operational history

The first flight was in 1989 and tests followed, but little more is known. No records were set and there is some evidence to suggest the performance was disappointing. Only one LAK-15 was built.

Specifications

References

1980s Soviet sailplanes
LAK aircraft
Aircraft first flown in 1989
Mid-wing aircraft
T-tail aircraft